Barbara Haščáková (born 11 December 1979) is a Slovak singer of pop music. She won the Best Female Singer prize at the Slávik Awards in 1998, following it up with nominations for 1999 and 2000 when the award went to Jana Kirschner. In addition to her solo career, she also formed part of the duo act MC Erik & Barbara with MC Erik. Haščáková moved in 1999 to the United States, where she spent time living in the state of Wyoming.

Discography

Studio albums
1997: Barbara
1999: Ver, Že Ja
2003: Secrets of Happiness
2006: Me & My Music

Awards and nominations

References

External links

1979 births
Living people
21st-century Slovak women singers
Musicians from Košice
20th-century Slovak women singers